Todd Harris Goldman is a controversial American entrepreneur and the founder of David and Goliath, a merchandise company that produces clothing, posters and other merchandise featuring a variety of slogans based on older designs and the work of other artists.

According to unverified data provided by Goldman to the Wall Street Journal during an interview, the sales volume of David and Goliath was 90 million USD in 2004. Goldman came under fire in 2004 and 2008 for controversial slogans, and in 2007 for plagiarism.

Early life
Goldman began drawing pictures in elementary school. Goldman later attended the University of Florida where he graduated with a degree in accounting.

Launch of company
Goldman launched D&G in 2000, in Clearwater, Florida. Primarily a clothing company, D&G also produces sleepwear with various designs, books, bags, and other accessories. Goldman achieved some notoriety for printing merchandise containing misandrous slogans, including "Boys are stupid, throw rocks at them!", "Boys are smelly", "Boys have cooties", etc.  These are featured on T-shirts, bumper stickers, and other accessories.  In 2004, Goldman was criticized for the slogans.

In 2005 Goldman authored a book entitled Boys Are Stupid, Throw Rocks at Them! which was also translated into Russian. Goldman released a Boys Are Stupid - The Game based on his artwork by the same name. Goldman also released Stupidopoly, a trading game.  Also in 2005, Todd Goldman started selling art in the Jack Gallery.

In 2007, Goldman was accused of plagiarism.  In June 2007 Goldman began working with FOX on a show entitled The Uglies, about the ugliest family in the world.   In 2008, Goldman teamed up with Ashton Kutcher and Kutcher's production partner Jason Goldberg to design an animated original series as seen through the eyes of a group of teenage girls called BLAHgirls.com.  In 2008, Goldman was criticized by feminist groups for a shirt alluding to rape.

In 2009, Goldman released two children's books with Random House Publishing – The Zoo I Drew and Animal Soup. The books were published under his pen name of "Todd H. Doodler".

Controversies

"Boys are stupid, throw rocks at them!" controversy

Goldman's work became the target of criticism: in 2004, Los Angeles based radio host and men's rights activist Glenn Sacks initiated a campaign against the "Boys are Stupid..." T-shirts saying that they were part of a general societal mood that stigmatized and victimized boys. The campaign led to the line of shirts being pulled from several thousand retailers across the United States in 2005, including Dapy, K-Mart, Disney Store, and Nordstrom. Masculist groups said that the shirts support anti-male sentiments. Others wrote that they encourage children to become participants in the battle of the sexes.  Goldman was named as number 97 on Bernard Goldberg's 2005 list of 100 People Who Are Screwing Up America. Goldberg also criticized Goldman's slogans for being part of what he called a boy-bashing craze, in which the makers of related products do not realize (or do not care) that young men have higher rates of depression and suicide than young women in America. Goldman responded to the criticism, stating that he "hopes to be ranked higher next year."

Plagiarism
In April 2007, Goldman was accused of plagiarism by webcartoonist Dave "Shmorky" Kelly, in a post on the Something Awful forums, saying that Goldman's piece "Dear God Make Everyone Die" was traced directly from a 2001 Purple Pussy comic by Kelly.  Mike Tyndall maintains a page which summarizes the original Something Awful thread, at which dozens of images are compared, with the claim that Goldman plagiarized many artists.

On May 3, 2007, Goldman's publicity agent announced that Goldman (who initially dismissed the controversy as "false accusations and blogging" in the contact with the media) and Kelly had reached a settlement: Goldman would pay Kelly the money he earned from the paintings and Kelly would drop the case. Goldman's art dealer said that several art galleries stopped showing Goldman's work and the wholesalers who buy Goldman's posters canceled their orders and asked for refunds for unsold stock. "I lost the three biggest poster distributors in America," his art dealer, Jack Solomon, said.  Goldman later reported that the poster distributors came back.

In an interview with Sense magazine, Goldman said, "I guess what happened was this: I have a whole design team that works back in Florida creating t-shirts for me. And then I take some of these images and make paintings out of them. If we do 50 t-shirts a month we probably create over 300 images to narrow down to those 50. Listen, I couldn't paint in my lifetime the amount of stuff that we've done. I thought that image was created internally within 'David and Goliath'. I guess the original idea came from that Kelly guy which one of my artists had seen. We changed it to "Please God Make All my Friends Fat," because the Die wouldn't sell on T-shirts. But I thought it'd make a great painting. So I painted two images from it. 5 months later it was hanging in this gallery and someone saw it and started this whole Internet thing. When I found out it wasn't our image, I apologized to the guy and gave him the full proceeds for the sale of the paintings. They sold for $10,000. So I didn't profit from him. There was no lawsuit from it. But then a whole can of worms opens up and suddenly I'm knocking off everyone apparently."

References

External links
 
 
 Wireless article:
 
 
 
 
 

American artists
Living people
Year of birth missing (living people)
University of Florida alumni
Place of birth missing (living people)
American businesspeople
People involved in plagiarism controversies